La Charité-sur-Loire (before 1961: La Charité) is a commune in the Nièvre department and Bourgogne-Franche-Comté region of eastern France.

Geography

La Charité-sur-Loire lies on the right, eastern bank of the river Loire, about 25 km northwest of Nevers. La Charité station has rail connections to Nevers, Cosne-sur-Loire and Paris. The A77 autoroute (Montargis–Nevers) passes east of the town.

History
The settlement of La Charité grew up around the Cluniac priory of that name, founded on an island site in the River Loire in 1089.

During the Hundred Years War, the town was liberated from the English by French forces only in 1435. Joan of Arc tried to liberate the city in 1429 but failed.

A great fire ravaged the town in 1559, leaving the nave of Sainte-Croix-Notre-Dame in a ruinous state for many years. The nave was finally restored by the late 17th century, albeit with its length diminished and the stone of the original facade repurposed in the reconstruction works.

In the second of the French Wars of Religion (1567–8) La Charité withstood eight months of siege by Catholic forces. It would later be one of the fortified towns given the status of Huguenot safe havens by the Peace of Saint-Germain-en-Laye (August 1570).

By the time of the French Revolution only a dozen monks remained in the priory, which was sold to private individuals and preserved. An improved highway that was to have been driven through the church was deflected by the report of Prosper Mérimée, the first inspector of monuments (and author of Carmen), who classed it as worth saving in 1840.

Gallery

Population

Sights
The priory church, burial place of Simon I de Senlis, Earl of Huntingdon-Northampton. 
The church of Sainte-Croix-Notre-Dame, listed as a UNESCO World Heritage Site in 1998, as part of the Routes of Santiago de Compostela in France.

See also
Communes of the Nièvre department

References

External links
Official website 
La Charité on the site Bourgogne Romane 

Communes of Nièvre
World Heritage Sites in France